Boris Caesar Wilhelm Hagelin (2 July 1892 – 7 September 1983) was a Swedish businessman and inventor of encryption machines.

Biography
Born of Swedish parents in Adshikent, Russian Empire, Hagelin attended Lundsberg boarding school and later studied mechanical engineering at the Royal Institute of Technology in Stockholm, graduating in 1914. He gained experience in engineering through work in Sweden and the United States.

His father Karl Wilhelm Hagelin worked for Nobel in Baku, but the family returned to Sweden after the Russian revolution. Karl Wilhelm was an investor in Arvid Gerhard Damm's company Aktiebolaget Cryptograph, established to sell rotor machines built using Damm's 1919 patent. Boris Hagelin was placed in the firm to represent the family investment. In 1925, Hagelin took over the firm, later reorganising it as Aktiebolaget Cryptoteknik in 1932. His machines competed with Scherbius' Enigma machines, but sold rather better.

At the beginning of World War II, Hagelin moved from Sweden to Switzerland, all the way across Germany and through Berlin to Genoa, carrying the design documents for the company's latest machine, and re-established his company there (it still operates as Crypto AG in Zug). That design was small, cheap and moderately secure, and he convinced the US military to adopt it. Many tens of thousands of them were made, and Hagelin became quite wealthy as a result. Hagelin fraudulently sold compromised machines to a variety of customers. Historian David Kahn has suggested that Hagelin was the only cypher-machine maker who ever became a millionaire.

Boris is the great-grandfather of Carl Hagelin, current NHL player for the Washington Capitals.

Patents
 	(B-21)
 	(C-35)
 
 
 	(CD-57)

See also
 C-36 (cipher machine)
 M-209
 C-52 (cipher machine)

References

Further reading
 Boris CW Hagelin, The Story of the Hagelin Cryptos, Cryptologia, 18(3), July 1994, pp 204–242.

External links
 History of Boris Hagelin
 Chart of the evolution of Hagelin / CRYPTO AG machines
 Hagelin BC-52 Cipher Machine Simulator
 Hagelin US M-209 Cipher Machine Simulator
 

1892 births
1983 deaths
KTH Royal Institute of Technology alumni
Cipher-machine cryptographers
20th-century Swedish businesspeople
20th-century Swedish inventors
Swedish cryptographers
Swedish expatriates in Switzerland
People from Goygol District
Expatriates of Sweden in the Russian Empire